The Jodhpur–Jaisalmer line or Jaisalmer–Jodhpur line is a railway route on the North Western Railway zone of Indian Railways. This route plays an important role in rail transportation of Bikaner division, Jodhpur division of Rajasthan state.

History

 The first phase, from Jodhpur Junction to Osian was opened on 21 September 1913.
 The second phase, from Osian to Marwar Lohawat was opened on 17 March 1914.
 The third phase, from Marwar Lohawat to Phalodi Junction was opened on 12 May 1914.

Whereas, the branch line section from Lalgarh Junction to Kolayat which comes under the Bikaner State Railway was opened on 30 October 1922.

After that, the conversion of main line into  broad gauge was started in 2003, Which it was important for military purpose because this railway line passes through nearest of International border of India, which was approved in the rail budget 1993–94. was opened on 15 December 2006.

Trains Passing through this line

Main
 Jaisalmer–Jodhpur Express
 Ranikhet Express
 Corbett Park Link Express
 Bandra Terminus–Jaisalmer Superfast Express

Branch
 Jaisalmer–Lalgarh Express
 Leelan Express
 Bhavnagar Terminus–Udhampur Janmabhoomi Express

References

5 ft 6 in gauge railways in India
Jodhpur railway division
Rail transport in Rajasthan
Bikaner railway division